Joey DeMaio (born March 6, 1954) is an American musician who is the bass player and main songwriter for the heavy metal band Manowar which he founded in 1980. He is also the founder and CEO of Magic Circle Music.

Biography 
He is a childhood friend of Manowar singer Eric Adams. DeMaio played bass in several school bands. In the 1970s, he toured with the musical Godspell (premiere in 1971 in New York City), taking musical lessons with the conductor.
He worked as a pyro-tech for Black Sabbath during their "Heaven and Hell" tour.

In 2006, shortly after creating the record label Magic Circle Music, DeMaio became a manager of the Italian metal band Rhapsody of Fire. He is also a producer for the band HolyHell.

See also 
Manowar discography

References

External links 
 Official Manowar website

Living people
People from Auburn, New York
Auburn High School (Auburn, New York) alumni
American rock bass guitarists
American heavy metal bass guitarists
American male bass guitarists
American people of Italian descent
Manowar members
1954 births
Guitarists from New York (state)
American male guitarists
20th-century American bass guitarists
21st-century American bass guitarists